Robert Walsingham may refer to:
 Robert Walsingham (pirate), 17th-century English pirate
 Robert Boyle-Walsingham (1736–1780), also known as Robert Walsingham, English politician, MP for Fowey and Knaresborough

See also 
 Walsingham (surname)